William Douglas, 10th Earl of Angus (15543 March 1611) was a Scottish nobleman. He was the son of William Douglas, 9th Earl of Angus (1533–1591). He was a direct descendant of King James I through his paternal grandmother, Agnes Keith, a daughter of William Keith, 3rd Earl Marischal.

Career
Douglas studied at St. Andrews University and joined the household of the Earl of Morton. Subsequently, while visiting the French court, he became a Catholic, and was in consequence, upon his return, disinherited and placed under restraint.

Nevertheless, Douglas succeeded to his father's titles and estates in 1591, and though in 1592 he was disgraced for his complicity in Lord Bothwell's plot, he was soon liberated and performed useful services as the King's Lieutenant in the north of Scotland. In June 1592 he was injured falling from his horse while hunting with James VI and sent for drugs from the surgeon Gilbert Primrose.

In July 1592 he asked for help from Queen Elizabeth in a plot with the Earl of Erroll and other lords against John Maitland of Thirlestane, the Chancellor. Lord Maxwell accused him of misdemeanours including meeting the rebels James Douglas of Spott and the Countess of Bothwell. He protested his absolute rejection of Spanish offers, but in October he signed the Spanish Blanks. On the discovery of this treason he was imprisoned in Edinburgh Castle on his return to Scotland in January 1593.

Douglas escaped from Edinburgh Castle on 13 February 1593 with the help of his Countess, joining the Earls of Huntly and Erroll in the north. They were offered an Act of "oblivion" or "abolition" provided they renounced their religion or quit Scotland. Declining these conditions they were declared traitors and "forfeited."

They remained in rebellion, and in July 1594 an attack made by them on Aberdeen roused James's anger. Huntly and Erroll were subdued by James himself in the north, and Angus failed in an attempt upon Edinburgh in concert with the Earl of Bothwell.

Subsequently, in 1597 they all renounced their religion, declared themselves Presbyterians, and were restored to their estates and honours. Angus was again included in the Privy Council, and in June 1598 was appointed the King's Lieutenant in southern Scotland, in which capacity he showed great zeal and conducted the "Raid of Dumfries," as the campaign against the Johnstones was called. At Christmas time in 1598 the English diplomat George Nicholson heard that people were saying Angus wore a jewel resembling a cross in his hat (which might be taken a sign of Catholicism), but the king said it was not and laughed at their daftness.

Angus, offended at the advancement of Huntly to a Marquessate, recanted, resisted all the arguments of the ministers to bring him to a "better mind," and was again excommunicated in 1608.

In 1609 Douglas withdrew into exile, and died in Paris, France, on 3 March 1611. He is buried at the Abbey of Saint-Germain-des-Prés.

Household accounts
A household account for the Earl survives. It commences on 11 June 1608 when the Earl moved his lodging in Glasgow from the house of George Lyon to that of John Ross. In October he moved to the Canongate of Edinburgh. On 5 November he moved to Tantallon Castle.

Quotation
From The Scottish Nation:

Marriage and children
Douglas married Elizabeth Oliphant, a daughter of Lawrence, 4th Lord of Oliphant, in spring 1585, and they had three sons and three daughters. His second son, James, was created Lord Mordington in 1641. His daughter Mary was married to Alexander Livingston, 2nd Earl of Linlithgow.

Douglas was succeeded by his son William, as 11th earl of Angus, afterwards 1st marquess of Douglas (1580–1660). The title Earl of Angus is now held by the Duke of Hamilton, and is used as a courtesy title for the eldest son of the heir apparent to the current dukedom.

References 

1552 births
1611 deaths
Burials at Saint-Germain-des-Prés (abbey)
Converts to Roman Catholicism from Calvinism
Alumni of the University of St Andrews
Earls of Angus
William Douglas, 10th Earl of Angus
Members of the Privy Council of Scotland
Scottish Roman Catholics